Eugene Douglas Spangler (December 17, 1922 – December 11, 2010) was a former football player who played for the Detroit Lions of the National Football League (NFL) in 1946. He appeared in six games and made four kick returns for 63 yards. He also made one rush attempt for one yard.

He also played minor league baseball in 1946, hitting .282 with 49 hits in 48 games for the Portland Gulls of the New England League.

Personal life
He was born in Huntington, Arkansas and died in Sarasota, Florida. He attended Coffeyville High School and then University of Tulsa.

References

1922 births
2010 deaths
Detroit Lions players
Tulsa Golden Hurricane football players
University of Tulsa alumni